The Intermediate Math League of Eastern Massachusetts (or IMLEM) is a math league for middle schools across Eastern Massachusetts. A brief history of IMLEM is given in its By-Laws:

Schools
As of 2017, 86 different schools attend the competition. Each school is allowed to send more than 1 team and each team can consist of at most 10 people. Alternates, people who are not officially part of team, can be taken too. There are a total of 15 different geographic clusters of schools and there is even a cluster of schools from Pennsylvania. The schools are then separated into different divisions with the schools in each division be approximately the same level. Schools can then make their way up through divisions to try to get into the top division, which is the Lexington Division. In total there are 13 divisions. 
 
Schools may send more than one team, however no student can compete on more than one team in a year. Also, a school may send alternates to gain the experience of a meet.

Meets
IMLEM has five meets every year, one in October, November, January, February, and March. For the first three meets, no calculators or external aids of any sort are allowed for any round. However, for the last two meets, calculators without programming or graphing capabilities, and without a QWERTY keyboard, are allowed for all rounds.

Meets are held at distinct locations for each of the ten geographic clusters. Schools within the clusters generally hold at most one of the meets. Each of the meets are generally held on the same day by all clusters; however for scheduling conflicts, schools may host meets on other days.

There are five individual categories, and they are: Mystery, Geometry, Number Theory, Arithmetic, and Algebra. Each individual round contains three questions, varying in content but focusing on topics published by the test writer. Questions in individual rounds are worth 2 points each. (Before this was the case, questions would be worth the question number, i.e., one point for question one, two points for question two and three points for question three.) Students are given 10 minutes to complete the round, along with a 1-minute warning.

The sixth category is a 15-minute team round that consists of six or nine questions (The amount of questions is unknown before the round starts). The entire team collaborates to solve each of the questions. The questions are usually based on topics from the five individual rounds with some extra knowledge required to solve other questions.

Students take three individual categories, and no more than six students on a team may take a single category. In a round, the maximum score for an individual is 6, and the maximum score for a team is 36. It follows that the maximum individual score is 18, and the maximum team score is 216.

18s are not uncommon, and each meet sees many individuals who get 18s. Coming into the 2004-05 school year, a score above 200 had been achieved only five times: twice by Diamond Middle School, twice by Clarke Middle School, and the long-standing record of 205 set by Marblehead in 1983. (This was when individual rounds were weighted 1-2-3 instead of 2-2-2.) The first meet of 2004-05 saw two teams score 200: Clarke scored 200, and Diamond shattered the record by scoring 212. Diamond scored perfect 36s in each of the rounds except for round 3 (number theory), in which 2 students each got a question wrong.

The 2007-08 season saw Clarke Middle School shatter many records, recent and not alike. Firstly, Clarke scored 1006 for the year, which is an average of 201.2 per meet. This broke the previous record set by Diamond back in the 2004-05 year. Secondly, they outscored second place Diamond by 122 points, also breaking a Diamond record, this one set in 2005-06. This is in part an effect of the test-writers' push to make problems easier so as to encourage more participation.

Each of the meets follows the following basic format. Each of the teams arrive usually by 3:15, and after snacks, the five individual rounds are held in succession. After that, a fifteen-minute team round is conducted. For all rounds, alternates and regulars are split. Finally, awards are distributed and teams should depart around 5:30.

Topics

Divisions

† Year indicated is that of the end of that school year (i.e., 2007 represents the 2006-07 school year).

Notes and references

External links
IMLEM Math League
IMLEM By-Laws, March 2003

Mathematics competitions